Ivar Bauck (12 February 1863 – 1 November 1937) was a Norwegian four-star general, known as a vocal opponent of the disarmament policies of successive Norwegian governments in the 1920s and 1930s.

He was born in Trondheim. He graduated on top of his class from the Norwegian Military Academy in 1885. He pursued his higher military studies at the Norwegian Military College, graduating in 1888, again on top of his class.

In 1919 he reached the rank of Major General, and became Chief of the General Staff. From 1930 to 1931 he served as the  Commanding General of Norway.

Family 
Ivar Bauck was the grandfather of Auschwitz survivor and bestselling author Erling Bauck.

References

1863 births
1937 deaths
People from Trondheim
Norwegian Army generals